Darren Daly (born 11 March 1987) is a Gaelic footballer who plays for the Fingal Ravens club and, formerly, for the Dublin county team.

In April 2013, Daly was part of the Dublin team that defeated Tyrone by 0-18 to 0-17 to win the 2013 National Football League, first league title since 1993.
Daly made his Championship debut in June 2013 against Westmeath and came on as a substitute in the 2013 All-Ireland Senior Football Championship Final win against Mayo.

References

1987 births
Living people
Dublin inter-county Gaelic footballers
Gaelic football backs
Sportspeople from Dublin (city)
Winners of six All-Ireland medals (Gaelic football)